Mateo Carreras (born 17 December 1999) is an Argentine rugby union player who plays for the Newcastle Falcons. On 21 November 2019, he was named in the Jaguares squad for the 2020 Super Rugby season. His playing position is Wing.

Despite sharing the same last name as Santiago Carreras of Gloucester and playing in a common position, the players are not related. Santiago Carreras is from Córdoba; Mateo Carreras is from Tucumán.

References

External links
 

Jaguares (Super Rugby) players
Newcastle Falcons players
Rugby union wings
Argentine rugby union players
1999 births
Living people